The Znojmo Catacombs are a vast labyrinth of underground passageways, cellars and subcellars situated under the historic city of Znojmo, in the Czech Republic.  They were initially developed for defensive purposes.

Development of the cellars 
The grottos date back to the 14th century, and were gradually expanded in the 15th century by connecting the individual cellars beneath the houses and palaces in the city into an elaborate labyrinth.

Uses of the cellars 
The catacombs were initially created to protect the inhabitants of the city against invading forces. In some places the passageways led under the fortifications and out of the city, allowing the hidden inhabitants to escape from the town to search for food in times of siege.

The caverns were adequately ventilated by air shafts. Fireplaces in the cellars were connected to house chimneys. Smoke could be seen by enemies, emanating from seemingly empty houses, making the town resemble a ghost town. Znojmo's inhabitants could survive for a long time in the refuge due to its wells and a drainage system.

If enemies happened to find an entrance to the cellars, they would have to deal with defensive measures, including slippery slides which would drop invaders into deep wells that could not be scaled without ladders, as well as trapdoors and narrow passageways.

Later the cellars were used for storage, especially the storage of wine.

The catacombs are now a tourist attraction, with a portion of the cellars open to the public April to October for a fee.

See also 
 Odessa Catacombs
 Tunnel
 Underground city
 Rock cut architecture
 Znojmo Town Hall Tower

References

External links 
  cave information website

Buildings and structures in Znojmo
Catacombs
Tourist attractions in the South Moravian Region